Songok is a surname of Kenyan origin that may refer to:

Boniface Songok (born 1980), Kenyan long-distance track runner
Isaac Kiprono Songok (born 1984), Kenyan middle- and long-distance runner
Kimaru Songok (born 1936), Kenyan 400 metres hurdler and first All-Africa Games champion

See also
Jong Song-ok, North Korean marathon runner and 1999 world champion

Kenyan names